Tragosoma pilosicorne is a species of long-horned beetle in the family Cerambycidae. It is found in North America.

References

Further reading

 
 

Prioninae
Articles created by Qbugbot
Beetles described in 1890